The Cordillera Central is the highest of the three branches of the Colombian Andes. The range extends from south to north dividing from the Colombian Massif in Cauca Department to the Serranía de San Lucas in Bolivar Departments.

Geography
The range is bounded by the Cauca and Magdalena river valleys to the west and east, respectively.

The Cauca Valley montane forests ecoregion covers the western slope of the range. The Magdalena Valley montane forests cover the eastern slopes and the northern end of the cordillera. The Northern Andean páramo covers the highest elevations.

Highest peaks
 Nevado del Huila -  - Cauca, Huila & Tolima
 Nevado del Ruiz -  - Caldas & Tolima
 Nevado del Tolima -  - Tolima
 Nevado de Santa Isabel -  - Risaralda, Tolima & Caldas
 Nevado del Quindio -  - Quindio, Tolima & Risaralda
 Cerro Pan de Azucar -  - Cauca & Huila
 Puracé -  - Cauca & Huila

Protected Areas
 PNN Los Nevados
 PNN Nevado del Huila
 PNN Puracé
 PNN Las Hermosas
 PNN Selva de Florencia
 SFF Otún Quimbaya
 SFF Serranía de las Minas - proposed

See also 
 Geography of Colombia
 Andean Region, Colombia
 Cordillera Occidental (Colombia)
 Cordillera Oriental (Colombia)

References 

Mountain ranges of the Andes
Mountain ranges of Colombia